McLaren Vale  is a wine region in South Australia

McLaren Vale  may also refer to:

McLaren Vale,  South Australia, a town and locality
McLaren Vale Football Club, a former Australian rules football team in South Australia
McLaren Vale railway station, a former railway station in South Australia

See also
McLaren (disambiguation)